Roadwar 2000 is a 1986 video game published by Strategic Simulations, Inc. It is a turn-based strategy game set in a post-apocalyptic future which resembles the world portrayed in the Mad Max films.

Gameplay and plot

In 1999, a terrorist group unleashes a deadly virus on the United States, leading to its collapse.  Various vigilante and survivalist groups appear and cars become the primary form of transportation and combat.

The player starts off as sort of a scavenger and attempts to build up an army capable of making crossings between cities on highways, which have become littered with hordes of marauding mutants, cannibals, and criminal gangs.

Winning enough battles and gathering a sizable army may bring the player's character to attention of the ailing US government, who will recruit the player to find eight missing scientists, America's only hope to finding a cure for the disease.  The player must bring them back to a secret base.  Along the way, the player must loot cities and scavenge for needed supplies and munitions.

The game calculates and displays detailed statistics during combat encounters which, not surprisingly, occur fairly often.  While these text messages were displayed in simple text on the early versions of the game, the Amiga and Atari ST versions accompany these battles with digitized sound.

Platforms
Roadwar 2000 was originally released for the Apple II and Commodore 64 in 1986.  In 1987, it was ported to the Amiga, Atari ST, Apple IIGS, FM-7, NEC PC-8801 and DOS. The Amiga, Atari ST and Apple IIGS versions, developed by Westwood Associates, sported digital sound effects and higher-quality graphics than the previous versions.

Reception

SSI sold 44,044 copies of Roadwar 2000 in North America. The game was reviewed in 1987 in Dragon #118 by Hartley and Patricia Lesser in "The Role of Computers" column.  The reviewers stated that "Roadwar 2000 is a great offering and is easily enjoyed by players who have fantasy role-playing backgrounds because you do, indeed, control the shots for your
crew." In a subsequent column, the reviewers gave the game 5 out of 5 stars. Compute! stated that the game successfully combined individual combat and strategy with good graphics, and concluded that it was "yet another successful product from SSI". In 1992 and 1994 survey of science fiction games, Computer Gaming World gave the title two-plus stars of five, stating that "It is quite dated today, although it can be fun as a semi-'no brainer'".

Robbie Robberson reviewed Roadwar 2000 in Space Gamer/Fantasy Gamer No. 81. Robberson commented that "In short, the Roadwar series is an example of a good idea that is short circuited by its components. If Strategic Simulations, Inc. can release these games with a better and quicker combat routine, or better yet, reduce the incidence of combat, these games would be a required addition to every serious computer gamer's library. As of now, they are simply entertaining in the short run, and tedious in the long."

Reviews
Happy Computer (1986)
Computer Gamer (Apr, 1987)
ASM (Aktueller Software Markt) (May, 1987)

Sequel
Roadwar 2000 was followed by Roadwar Europa in 1987.  It was developed for the same platforms as R2000.  This game, set in Europe, is graphically almost identical to its predecessor. Terrorists have devastated one city and are threatening to blow up the continent. It is up to the player to stop them.

References

External links

Roadwar 2000 at the Hall of Light

1986 video games
Alternate history video games
Amiga games
Apple II games
Apple IIGS games
Atari ST games
Commodore 64 games
DOS games
NEC PC-8801 games
NEC PC-9801 games
Post-apocalyptic video games
Sharp X1 games
Single-player video games
Strategic Simulations games
Video games developed in the United States
Video games set in 2000
Video games set in North America
Westwood Studios games